The Violin Sonata No. 6 of Ludwig van Beethoven in A major, the first of his Opus 30 set, was composed between 1801 and 1802, published in May 1803, and dedicated to Tsar Alexander I of Russia. It has three movements:

 Allegro
 Adagio molto espressivo
 Allegretto con variazioni

The work takes approximately 22 minutes to perform.

External links

 
 
 
Performance of Violin Sonata No. 6 by Corey Cerovsek (violin) and Paavali Jumppanen (piano) from the Isabella Stewart Gardner Museum in MP3 format

Violin Sonata 06
1802 compositions
Compositions in A major
Music with dedications